Luciano Mercante (4 September 1902 – 15 January 1982) was an Italian sculptor. In 1936 he won a silver medal in the art competitions of the Olympic Games for his "Medaglie" ("Medals").

References

External links
 profile

1902 births
1982 deaths
20th-century Italian sculptors
20th-century Italian male artists
Italian male sculptors
Olympic silver medalists in art competitions
Medalists at the 1936 Summer Olympics
Olympic competitors in art competitions